George Stransky (born January 16, 1944) is an American water polo player. He competed in the men's tournament at the 1964 Summer Olympics. In 1984, he was inducted into the USA Water Polo Hall of Fame.

See also
 List of men's Olympic water polo tournament goalkeepers

References

External links
 

1944 births
Living people
People from Stockbridge, Massachusetts
American male water polo players
Water polo goalkeepers
Olympic water polo players of the United States
Water polo players at the 1964 Summer Olympics
Sportspeople from Massachusetts